Alexander Chocke (1594–1625) of Shalbourne, Wiltshire and late of Hungerford Park, Berkshire, was an English politician who sat in the House of Commons from 1621 to 1622.

Chocke was of Somerset. He matriculated at Queen's College, Oxford on 19 May 1609 aged 15. In 1621, he was elected Member of Parliament for Ludgershall.

Notes

References

1590s births
1625 deaths
English MPs 1621–1622
Alumni of The Queen's College, Oxford
People from Shalbourne
People from Hungerford